Star Trek Revisitations is a graphic novel written by Howard Weinstein and illustrated by Gordon Purcell and Rod Whigham, based on the DC Comics Star Trek series, and published by Titan.

Plot summary
Star Trek Revisitations features Harry Mudd becoming involved in an intergalactic rebellion.

Reception
Steve Faragher reviewed Star Trek Revisitations for Arcane magazine, rating it a 3 out of 10 overall. Faragher comments that "Revisitiations is standard licensed stuff - two bland and predictable stories peppered with somebody else's ideas of what our favourite characters from the original series are like."

References

DC Comics titles